Local elections were held in Bacolod on May 9, 2022, as part of the Philippine general election. The elective local posts in the city: the mayor, vice mayor, the congressman, and twelve councilors, were filled in.

Background
Incumbent Mayor Evelio Leonardia will run for reelection. He will be challenged by former Negros Occidental 3rd district representative Albee Benitez.

Incumbent Vice Mayor El Cid Familiaran will also run for reelection. He will face incumbent councilors Caesar Distrito and Wilson Gamboa Jr.

Representative Greg Gasataya will run for his third term. His opponents are businessman and former BREDCO Port consultant Daniel Alfonso Atayde, former police officer Wilfredo David, engineer Narciso San Miguel and independent candidate Romy Gustilo.

Mayoral and vice mayoral election
The candidates for mayor and vice mayor with the highest number of votes wins the seat; they are voted separately, therefore, they may be of different parties when elected.

Mayor

Vice Mayor

District Representative election

City Council election
Election is via plurality-at-large voting: A voter votes for up to twelve candidates, then the ten candidates with the highest number of votes are elected.

Grupo Progreso

Asenso Bacolod

Results

|-bgcolor=black
|colspan=5|

References

2022 Philippine local elections
Politics of Bacolod
May 2022 events in the Philippines